The Alabio duck, or locally known as Itik Alabio, is a breed of domestic duck from North Hulu Sungai Regency, Kalimantan Selatan, Indonesia.

How it is made
The breed is considered to be a cross of the local duck and the Pekin duck.

What its name means
The breed was named Alabio by Saleh Puspo, a veterinarian who conduct researches on this breed.

See also
 List of duck breeds

References

Duck breeds
Duck breeds originating in Indonesia